This is a complete list of Chicago Bears head coaches.  There have been 17 head coaches for the Chicago Bears, including coaches for the Decatur Staleys (1919–1920) and Chicago Staleys (1921). The Bears franchise was founded as the Decatur Staleys, a charter member of the American Professional Football Association.  The team moved to Chicago in 1921, and changed its name to the Bears in 1922, the same year the American Professional Football Association (APFA) changed its name to the National Football League (NFL).

The Chicago Bears have played more than 1,000 games. George Halas is the only coach to have more than one tenure and is the all-time leader in games coached and games won, while Ralph Jones leads all coaches in winning percentage with .706. Abe Gibron is statistically the worst coach of the Bears in terms of winning percentage, with a .268 average.

Of the 18 Bears coaches, three have been elected to the Pro Football Hall of Fame: George Halas, Paddy Driscoll, and Mike Ditka.  Several former players have been head coach for the Bears, including George Halas, Hunk Anderson, Luke Johnsos, Paddy Driscoll, Jim Dooley, Abe Gibron and Mike Ditka.

After Ditka was fired following the 1992 season, the Bears went through six head coaches starting with Dave Wannstedt, who coached until 1998. Dick Jauron took over in 1999 until he was fired in 2003. Lovie Smith was hired on January 14, 2004. Smith was fired on December 31, 2012, after the Bears missed the playoffs with a 10–6 record after starting the season 7–1. On January 16, 2013, Marc Trestman was hired to be the new head coach to take Smith's place. Trestman was fired on December 29, 2014, with a 13–19 record over two seasons. On January 16, 2015, John Fox was hired as the new head coach of the team. He compiled a 14–34 record over three seasons before being fired on January 1, 2018. A week later, Matt Nagy became the new head coach. Nagy was fired after the 2021 season. Matt Eberflus was named the new head coach on January 27, 2022.

Key

Coaches
Note: Statistics are accurate through the end of the 2021 NFL season.

Footnotes
 Official Chicago Bears record books list Halas as the first head coach in franchise history and therefore head coach Matt Eberflus would be the 17th head coach in franchise history.
  The winning percentage is calculated using the formula: 
  Robert E. Brannan became the coach of the club when it was established by the A. E. Staley Company of Decatur, Illinois in 1919 as a company team.
  No official records for the 1919 season in Chicago Bears record books, but the team finished the season 6–1.
  Halas' full coaching record with the Bears is 497 regular season games coached with a record of 318–148–31 and a W–L percentage of .682.  He is also 6–3 in 9 Playoff games.
  The NFL did not hold playoff games until 1932.
  Anderson and Johnsos were co-Head Coaches from 1942 to 1945.  They were appointed by Halas when he left to serve in the US Navy.

References

External links

 
 
 
 
 

 
Chicago Bears
Head coaches